The Isle of Man Constabulary is the national police service of the Isle of Man, an island of 85,000 inhabitants, situated approximately equidistant from Northern Ireland, Wales, Scotland and England.

Structures and deployment
The force has about 236 officers in its establishment. As the Isle of Man is not a part of the United Kingdom, the Constabulary is responsible to the Minister of Home Affairs of the Isle of Man Government. Nevertheless, the service volunteers itself for inspection by His Majesty's Inspectorate of Constabulary (HMIC) for England and Wales.

The force is split into four Neighbourhood Policing Teams (NPTs).  Each NPT is controlled by an inspector who has established a partnership with the local community to help solve issues affecting the local area.

There is a Criminal Investigation Department which includes the CID, Public Protection and Pro-active Teams

A small team of intelligence and drug trafficking officers exists dedicated to this. Drug trafficking is an assigned matter to the Isle of Man Customs and Excise.

An Operational Support Group which includes operational Firearms and Training, Public Order officers, a Search Team, Negotiators and Post Incident Managers. Armed officers generally utilize the Glock 17 9x19mm sidearm and favor the Heckler & Koch HK416 5.56x45mm rifle.

A major event for the force is the annual TT races.

The constabulary's headquarters are in Douglas. The present Chief Constable is Gary Roberts.

Uniform

In terms of uniform, the force looks very similar to police in the United Kingdom, apart from the Isle of Man custodian helmets worn by male constables and sergeants. White helmets were introduced in 1960 as a summer alternative to the older black helmets (partly for tourism reasons). White helmets were used as a summer option in other police forces (including Brighton, Southend-on-Sea and Swansea Borough Police forces; Peterborough City Police; the Metropolitan Police's band; and the New Zealand Police), but this practice ceased in the UK in 1969 and in New Zealand in the 1990s. The white helmet is now worn year round by officers on foot patrol. Officers on mobile patrol tend to wear peaked caps.

Officers of the rank of sergeant and above may carry a "signalling stick" when on foot patrol. This is in effect an additional rank indicator. Until very recently constables "acting up" in the rank of sergeant were referred to as "carrying the stick". If the "acting" was only short term, the stick was often the only indicator of their additional responsibilities.

Social media presence

The Isle of Man Constabulary have started to use social media, predominantly Twitter.

Controversies

During the tenure of Mike Culverhouse, the force was involved in the Manx Bugging Scandal, and almost all senior officers except the Chief Constable were either suspended, retired or dismissed due to the uncovering of widespread bugging.

Rank structure

The rank structure of the Isle of Man Constabulary follows the practice of United Kingdom county (as opposed to metropolitan) territorial police forces, except that there are no ranks of chief superintendent or assistant chief constable. There are currently three superintendents and four chief inspectors.

Chief Officers
 Chief Constable Gary Roberts, 2013 – present
 Chief Constable Mike Langdon, 2008–2013
 Deputy Chief Constable Gary Roberts, 2008–2013
 Chief Constable Mike Culverhouse, 1999–2007
 Deputy Chief Constable Mike Langdon, 2005–2007
 Deputy Chief Constable Neil Kinrade, 2000–2005
 Deputy Chief Constable Alan Cretney 1995-2000
 Chief Constable Robin Oake, 1986–1999
 Deputy Chief Constable Alan Cretney 1995-2000
 Chief Constable Frank Weedon, 1972–1986
 Chief Constable Christopher Beaty-Pownall, 1955–1972
 Superintendent Alfred Kelly 
 Chief Constable Major John Young, 1936–1954
 Chief Constable Colonel H W Madoc, 1911–1936
 Deputy Chief Constable John Thomas Quilliam, -1920
 Chief Constable William Freeth, 1888–1911
 Chief Constable Lieutenant Colonel William Paul, 1878–1888
 Deputy Chief Constable  William Boyde
 Deputy Chief Constable John Cain
 Deputy Chief Constable Thomas Cringle
 Deputy Chief Constable Richard Duke
 Deputy Chief Constable Charles Joshua Faragher
 Deputy Chief Constable William Faragher

Emergency services on the Isle of Man
Isle of Man Ambulance Service
Isle of Man Civil Defence Corps
Isle of Man Coastguard
Isle of Man Constabulary
Isle of Man Fire and Rescue Service
St John Ambulance non-governmental charity

See also 
 Aerial roof markings
 Fraud Squad (UK)
 Isle of Man Airport Police
Law enforcement in the United Kingdom

References

External links 
 

Police forces of the Crown Dependencies
 
Emergency services in the Isle of Man
1863 establishments in the Isle of Man
Organizations established in 1863